is a live DVD released by Miyavi on May 2, 2007. It was recorded during five concerts held at consecutive evenings at the Tokyo Geijutsu Gekijo. All songs are performed in the unplugged "dokusou" style and primarily rely on vocals and acoustic guitar, with support from percussionists, taiko drummers, human beatboxers, tap dancers and painters. The main feature is based on the September 18, 2006 performance, extras include behind-the-scenes footage and a documentary about the five-day concert series.

Track listing
 "Opening"
 "Jikoai, Jigajisan, Jiishiki Kajou (Instrumental)"
 "Selfish Love -Aishitekure, Aishiterukara"
 "Gigpig Boogie"
 "How to Love"
 "Kimi ni Funky Monkey Vibration"
 "Please, Please, Please"
 "Mata Yume de Aimashou"
 "Are You Ready to Rock?"
 "Oretachi Dake no Fighting Song (Tsusho: Neba Giba)"
 "Fuminshou no Nemuri Hime"
 "Are You Ready to Love?"
 "We Love You ~Sekai wa Kimi wo Aishiteru~"
 "Aishiteru Kara Hajime You"
 "Ending"

Miyavi video albums
2007 video albums
Live video albums
2007 live albums